Tropine is a derivative of tropane containing a hydroxyl group at the third carbon. It is also called 3-tropanol. It is a poisonous white hygroscopic crystalline powder. It is a heterocyclic alcohol and an amine.

Tropine is a central building block of many chemicals active in the nervous system, including tropane alkaloids. Some of these compounds, such as long-acting muscarinic antagonists are used as medicines because of these effects.

Occurrence
Tropine is a natural product found in the plants of deadly nightshade (Atropa belladonna) and devil's trumpet (Datura stramonium).

Chemistry

Synthesis
It can be prepared by hydrolysis of atropine  or other solanaceous alkaloids.

See also 
 Pseudotropine
 Atropine
 Tropinone
 Tropane alkaloid

References 

Tropanes
Secondary alcohols